Psychopath can refer to:

 Psychopathy
 Psychopath (1968 film)
 The Psychopath (1966 film)
 The Psychopath (1973 film)
 Psychopaths (film), a 2017 American horror film